Tommy Sparks is the self-titled debut studio album from the musician Tommy Sparks. It contains 10 tracks written by Tommy Sparks and produced by Mike Crossey. It was released through Island Records on 11 May 2009 in the United Kingdom. The album features his singles "I'm A Rope" and "She's Got Me Dancing". The single "Miracle" was released in August.

Track listing

Music videos
"I'm a Rope", directed by Max Vitali
"She's Got Me Dancing", directed by Eric Wareheim
"Miracle", directed by Shelley Love

2009 debut albums
Island Records albums